Special Force is a first-person shooter video game, developed and published by the Lebanese political group Hezbollah, created using the Genesis3D engine. The game is set in a 3D environment, in which the player takes the role of a Hezbollah combatant fighting the Israel Defense Forces.

The game can be played in Arabic, English, French and Persian.  The game sold out the first run of 8,000 copies within a week when it was released in Lebanon, Syria, Iran, Bahrain, and United Arab Emirates in early 2003.

See also
Special Force 2: Tale of the Truthful Pledge
America's Army
Rendition: Guantanamo
Under Ash
Under Siege, the sequel to Under Ash

References

External links
Official website in English (archived at the Wayback Machine)

 Digital Arabs: Representation in Video Games 

2003 video games
First-person shooters
Propaganda video games
Advergames
Video games developed in Lebanon
Video games with historical settings
Windows games
Windows-only games
Hezbollah